Patrick van Kalken (born 29 September 1975 in Rotterdam, South Holland) is a Dutch judoka.

Achievements

External links
 
 sports-reference

1975 births
Living people
Dutch male judoka
Judoka at the 2000 Summer Olympics
Olympic judoka of the Netherlands
Sportspeople from Rotterdam
20th-century Dutch people
21st-century Dutch people